Kembu Maru also Kenmu Maru (Kanji:) was a  cargo ship which was built in 1941 Taikoo Dockyard & Engineering Company of Hong Kong Ltd. She was built as Empire Blossom and was ready to be launched when Hong Kong was invaded by Japan in December 1941. The ship was completed by the Japanese and put into service. On 4 December 1943 she was damaged by American bombing at Kwajalein Atoll, sinking the next day.

Description
Empire Blossom was built as a  cargo ship by Taikoo Dockyard & Engineering Company of Hong Kong Ltd. She was laid down in May 1941, as yard number 303. The ship was completed in February 1943. She was powered by a triple expansion steam engine.

Career
The engine and boilers intended for Empire Blossom were sent to Singapore on 1 December 1941 aboard the Blue Funnel Line ship . The ship was launched as Empire Blossom. It was completed in February 1943 and put into service by the Imperial Japanese Navy as Kembu Maru.

She was carrying a cargo of aviation fuel in drums. The bombing caused the ship to explode, with a column of smoke  being seen. She sank the next day. At the time of her sinking she was in the Kwajalein Atoll.

References

1942 ships
Ships built in Hong Kong
Steamships of Japan
World War II merchant ships of Japan
Ships sunk by US aircraft
Empire ships
World War II shipwrecks in the South China Sea
Maritime incidents in December 1943
Ships built by the Taikoo Dockyard and Engineering Company